These are the international rankings of Cyprus

International rankings

References

Cyprus